Manuel Joaquín Riascos García (November 9, 1833 – August 8, 1875) was a Colombian General and politician who became acting President in rebellion of the United States of Colombia in 1867 for 45 days.

1833 births
1875 deaths
Presidents of Colombia
Presidential Designates of Colombia
Military personnel killed in action
Colombian Liberal Party politicians